Beizhuang Town is a town located in the Miyun District of Beijing, China. It lies in a basin inside the Yan Mountain Range, with Qingshui, Daihuangyan and Xiaohuangyan Rivers flowing through it. The town borders Taishitun Town in the north and west, Shimenshan Town in the east, and Dachengzi Town in the south. It had a total population of 5,993 as of 2020.

The name Beizhuang is taken from Beizhuang Village, the seat of the town's government. It can be literally translated as "North Villa".

History

Administrative divisions 
So far in 2021, Beizhuang Town is subdivided into 12 divisions, of those 1 is a community and 11 are villages. They are listed in the table below:

See also 
 List of township-level divisions of Beijing

References

Miyun District
Towns in Beijing